Ing. Fernando Espinoza Gutiérrez Airport  was located in Santiago de Querétaro, Querétaro, Mexico. This airport was inaugurated in 1955. Due to the construction of the new Querétaro International Airport in 2004, the airport is no longer used. The buildings and land that formed the airport are now government buildings, and were donated to the Universidad Autónoma de Querétaro.

References

External links
 Universidad Autónoma de Querétaro: Campus Aeropuerto

1955 establishments in Mexico
2004 disestablishments in Mexico
Airports established in 1955
Airports disestablished in 2004
Defunct airports in Mexico
Querétaro City
Transportation in Querétaro